The Church of Our Lady Star of the Sea is a Roman Catholic church in Singapore and comes under the jurisdiction of the Archdiocese of Singapore. The church is located at Yishun Street 22.

History
The church had its beginnings in the Naval Base area, in August 1949. This is now the area around Sembawang Road. Religious services started at an old Japanese language school which was left over from World War II. The school was located in Jalan Kedai, off Canberra Road.

Fr. Dominic Vendargon, (Aug 29, 1909–Aug 3, 2005) was appointed by the then Bishop of Malacca & Singapore, Bishop Michel Olçomendy, M.E.P., to formulate a self-sufficient parish. In August 1950, Fr. Vendargon was succeeded by Fr. Albert Fortier (Apr 24, 1911—Jan 13, 1998). Fr. Fortier conducted everything, from Masses, marriages and all other rites, at the Japanese school.

By 1952, the old school had become so rundown and unsafe that the British Colonial authorities advised Fr. Fortier to build a new church. Fr. Fortier found a plot of land in Jalan Sendudok which was part of the British Naval Base.  The British Colonial authorities approved the site for a 21-year lease.  The building of the church was completed in 1953.

Fr. Fortier was succeeded by Fr. I. Fernandez, for the next 10 years, followed by Fr. Bernard Binet from 1964 to 1968. Fr. Albert Fortier returned to assume the role of Parish Priest in July 1968.  Fr Fortier served in the church until his retirement on 31 December 1986. Fr. Amiotte-Suchet Louis (Aug 29, 1917—Oct 17, 1998) was appointed to take over from the duties of Fr. Fortier.

On 26 August 1987, the Church of Our Lady Star of the Sea was informed by the authorities that "the premises and the land are scheduled to be cleared by 31 December 1987 and you are hereby notified to move out by this date".

The present site for the Church of Our Lady Star of the Sea was bought by the Archdiocese of Singapore on 6 March 1989. The church was officially blessed by the Archbishop of Singapore, Gregory Yong, on 30 May 1992.

Organisation
The Church of Our Lady Star of the Sea currently has 3 priests administering to a parish population of 6000plus parishioners. The priests are:
 Parish Priest Reverend Father Gregoire van Giang, M.E.P.
 Reverend Father Lourdusamy Prasanna, H.G.N.

The church has the following ministries:
 Catechists
 Rite of Christian Initiation for Adults (RCIA)
 Legion of Mary
 St. Vincent De Paul Society (SVDP)
 Natural Family Planning
 Sacristy Family
 Choirs
 Altar Servers
 Youth Ministry
 Extraordinary ministers of Holy Communion
 Churchwardens
 Lectors
 Ministry of Sick
 Art & Deco
 Elders Group
 Bookshop
 Canteen
 Chinese-speaking Apostolate
 Indian-speaking Apostolate
 Filipino Apostolate

Neighbourhood Christian Community (NCC):
 Zone 100 
 Zone 200 
 Zone 300 
 Zone 400 
 Zone 600 
 Zone 700 
 Zone 800
 Zone Sembawang
 Zone Sembawang New Town

References

External links
 Official site

Roman Catholic churches in Singapore
Yishun